Dr. Killi Krupa Rani (born 19 November 1965) is an Indian politician. She is a former member of the Indian Parliament and previously represented Srikakulam from 2009 to 2014. She joined YSR Congress Party in 2019.

Career
Dr. Killi Kruparani is a Medical Practitioner by education. 
As a Convenor, Dr. Rammohan Rao Charitable Trust, for the last 20 years, she has worked towards providing free drinking water in rural areas, free medical camps, free deliveries, free cataract operations to the blind, pensions to the aged and needy, encouraging students by conducting talent tests and by giving scholarships.

She entered politics and joined the Indian National Congress party, on the eve of completion of Dr. YS Rajashekar Reddy's Padhayatra. Despite losing the parliament election in 2004, she won in 2009, defeating four-time MP, Yerran Naidu. She was inducted into the 15th Lok Sabha and Manmohan Singh's cabinet as Minister of State, Communications and Information Technology. She was a Member, Committee on Health and Family Welfare; Member, Consultative Committee, Ministry of External Affairs and Member, Central Social Welfare Board.

She lost in 2014 to Ram Mohan Naidu Kinjarapu. She quit Indian National Congress and later made an announcement that she would join YSRCP on 28 February 2019.

Interests
Dr. Killi is an avid reader and takes an interest in music, history, literature and travelling. She also published a book entitled The 100 years saga of Nehru's family.
She is a dedicated social worker.

References

1965 births
Living people
People from Srikakulam
India MPs 2009–2014
Women in Andhra Pradesh politics
Indian National Congress politicians from Andhra Pradesh
Lok Sabha members from Andhra Pradesh
21st-century Indian women politicians
21st-century Indian politicians
Women members of the Lok Sabha
People from Uttarandhra